Stolte can refer to:

 11508 Stolte, a main-belt asteroid discovered on October 12, 1990.
 Adele Stolte, German soprano singer in concert and Lieder, and an academic voice teacher.
 Christian Stolte, American actor.